The 1994 Chatham Cup was the 67th annual nationwide knockout football competition in New Zealand.

Up to the last 16 of the competition, the cup was run in three regions (northern, central, and southern), with an open draw from the quarter-finals on. National League teams received a bye until the third round (last 64). In all, 141 teams took part in the competition, which consisted of a preliminary round followed by five rounds proper, quarter-finals, semi-finals, and a final. Note: Different sources give different numberings for the rounds of the competition. Some record five rounds prior to the quarter-finals; others note a preliminary round followed by four full rounds. The first of these notations is used in this article.

The 1994 final
Waitakere City won the final, part of a 31-match undefeated run in all competitions.

The Jack Batty Memorial Cup is awarded to the player adjudged to have made to most positive impact in the Chatham Cup final. The winner of the 1994 Jack Batty Memorial Cup was Ivan Vicelich of Waitakere City.

Results

Third Round

* Won on penalties by Central (5-4)

Fourth Round

Fifth Round

Quarter-finals

Semi-finals

Final

References

Rec.Sport.Soccer Statistics Foundation New Zealand 1994 page
UltimateNZSoccer website 1994 Chatham Cup page

Chatham Cup
Chatham Cup
Chatham Cup